Adelaide's warbler (Setophaga adelaidae) is a bird endemic to the archipelago of Puerto Rico belonging to the genus Setophaga of the family Parulidae. The species is named after Adelaide Swift, daughter of Robert Swift, the person who captured the first specimen.

Description
The S. adelaidae complex was originally considered a single species, with three populations occurring in Barbuda, Puerto Rico and St. Lucia. Each of these populations were regarded as a subspecies, S.a. subita, S.a. adelaidae and S.a. delicata respectively. These subspecies were later elevated to species rank as the Barbuda warbler (Setophaga subita), the St. Lucia warbler (Setophaga delicata) and Adelaide's warbler.

In 2011, the American Ornithologists' Union reclassified the Parulidae, which resulted in D. adelaidae being transferred to genus Setophaga.

Adelaide's warbler has gray upperparts with yellow underparts. The species has a yellow line above the eye and a white half-moon below it.

Adelaide's warbler occurs in the main island of Puerto Rico and in the island municipality of Vieques. The species occurs mainly in dry forests in the southern region of Puerto Rico such as the Guánica State Forest, with some occurrences in the northern moist forests and the central mountain range, Cordillera Central.

Adelaide's warbler is an insectivore which gleans insects from the mid-top areas of the forest. It is also known to eat, although very rarely, spiders and small amphibians such as coquís. The species usually travels in mixed flocks which commonly include Puerto Rican todies, vireos and other New World warblers. Adelaide's warblers build nests at heights of 1 to 7 m in which the female deposits anywhere from 2 to 4 white eggs. The eggshells usually have small brown spots.

See also 

 Fauna of Puerto Rico
 List of birds of Puerto Rico
 List of endemic fauna of Puerto Rico
 List of Puerto Rican birds
 List of Vieques birds
 El Toro Wilderness

References

Further reading
 
  Sociedad Ortinológica Puertorriqueña – Reinita Mariposera
 

Adelaide's warbler
Endemic birds of Puerto Rico
Adelaide's warbler
Adelaide's warbler